Saxifraga aspera is a species of saxifrage known by the common name of rough saxifrage. It is placed in section Trachyphyllum of the genus Saxifraga. There are two subspecies, Saxifraga aspera subsp. aspera and Saxifraga aspera subsp. micrantha. It is a plant of the pan-Arctic tundra and is also found in Europe at moderately high altitudes in the Alps, Pyrenees and northern Apennines.

Description
The margins of the linear lanceolate leaves are fringed with short bristly hairs giving the plant a rough appearance. The foliaceous buds in the axils of the leaves are only half as long as their protecting leaves, a fact that distinguishes this species from the rather similar mossy saxifrage, Saxifraga bryoides. Each flower has five calyx lobes and five, slightly overlapping, broad white or cream coloured petals with a yellow blotch near the base and sometimes a number of yellow spots. The ten stamens are in two whorls, one slightly longer than the other. The ovary is superior  and the fruit is a two-celled capsule. Rough saxifrage flowers in June and July.

Distribution and habitat
Rough saxifrage is predominantly a plant of the Arctic tundra. The plant typically grows on damp rocks and gravel on the banks of streams but it is sometimes found growing in turf. It prefers acid conditions and avoids calcareous soils.

References

aspera
Alpine flora
Plants described in 1753
Taxa named by Carl Linnaeus